Calobre District is a district (distrito) of Veraguas Province in Panama. The population according to the 2000 census was 12,184; the latest official estimate (for 2019) ia 12,159. The district covers a total area of 806 km². The capital lies at the town of Calobre.

Administrative divisions
Calobre District is divided administratively into the following corregimientos:

Calobre
Barnizal
Chitra
El Cocla
El Potrero
La Laguna
La Raya de Calobre
La Tetilla
La Yeguada
Las Guías
Monjarás
San José

References

Districts of Panama
Veraguas Province